Drest son of Donuel ( or ; died 677) was king of the Picts from  663 until 672. Like his brother and predecessor Gartnait son of Donuel, and Gartnait's predecessor Talorgen son of Enfret, he reigned as a puppet king under the Northumbrian king Oswiu. Gartnait and Drest may have been sons of Domnall Brecc, who was king of Dál Riata from  629 until he was killed in 642.

The length of Drest's reign is uncertain: the Pictish king lists give him a reign of six or seven years, while contemporary Irish annals imply a reign of eight or nine years. His accession to the kingship may be connected to the Battle of Luith Feirn recorded in the Annals of Ulster as taking place in 664, or Oswiu may have forced an interregnum on the kingdom from 663-666, after the death of Drest's brother Gartnait in 663.

Drest was expelled from his kingdom in 671, an event normally connected with the failed Pictish revolt against Northumbrian rule that culminated in crushing defeat at the hands of Ecgfrith of Northumbria at the Battle of Two Rivers. Stephen of Ripon records in his Life of St Wilfrid that the Picts had "gathered together innumerable nations (gentes) from every nook and corner in the north", suggesting that Drest had joined forces with other territories which were otherwise not politically united. Drest's successor was Ecgfrith's cousin Bridei son of Beli, who would eventually defeat and kill Ecgfrith and overthrow the Northumbrian hegemony at the Battle of Dun Nechtain in 685.

After his expulsion Drest continued to receive attention from Irish annals, suggesting he remained in the orbit of the Abbey of Iona, until his death in 677.

Notes

References

 Anderson, Alan Orr, Early Sources of Scottish History A.D 500–1286, volume 1. Reprinted with corrections. Paul Watkins, Stamford, 1990.

External links
CELT: Corpus of Electronic Texts at University College Cork includes the Annals of Ulster, Tigernach, the Four Masters and Innisfallen, the Chronicon Scotorum, the Lebor Bretnach (which includes the Duan Albanach), Genealogies, and various Saints' Lives. Most are translated into English, or translations are in progress.
Pictish Chronicle 

7th-century births
677 deaths
Pictish monarchs
7th-century Scottish monarchs